P2Y purinoceptor 6 is a protein that in humans is encoded by the P2RY6 gene.

Function 

The product of this gene, P2Y6, belongs to the family of G-protein coupled receptors. This family has several receptor subtypes with different pharmacological selectivity, which overlaps in some cases, for various adenosine and uridine nucleotides. This receptor is responsive to UDP, partially responsive to UTP and ADP, and not responsive to ATP. Four transcript variants encoding the same isoform have been identified for this gene.

See also 
 P2Y receptor

References

Further reading

External links 

G protein-coupled receptors